Cynthia Louise Germanotta (née Bissett; born August 30, 1954) is an American philanthropist,  activist and entrepreneur. She is the president of the Born This Way Foundation, which she co-founded with her daughter Lady Gaga in 2012.

Early life, education, and career 
Germanotta was born and raised in Wheeling, West Virginia. Her parents were Paul Douglas Bissett, a State Farm insurance agent who sang with the McMechen Men's Chorus and the McMechen Methodist Choir, and Veronica Rose Ferrie. She is of Italian descent through her mother and Scottish, English and German descent through her father. She has an older brother, Paul, and a younger sister, Cheryl Ann.

Germanotta graduated from John Marshall High School. She then attended West Virginia University and earned a master's degree in public administration from George Washington University. While at West Virginia University, Germanotta was a cheerleader and a member of Chi Omega.

Germanotta worked for Verizon as a telecommunications executive in sales and management.

Philanthropy and activism 
In 2012, Germanotta and her daughter, Lady Gaga, co-founded the Born This Way Foundation, a non-profit organization focused on inspiring youth, ending bullying, and building up communities. Later that year, the foundation was awarded the Family Online Safety Institute's Award for Outstanding Achievement. Under Germanotta's leadership, the foundation also received the National Association of School Psychologists' Special Friend to Children Award in 2013 and the Anti-Defamation League's No Place for Hate Making a Difference Award in 2015. Germanotta was honored by Boston PFLAG and by Dancing Classrooms for her advocacy regarding youth mental health.

Germanotta is an advocate for the Women's Council on Heart Health for the Ronald O. Perelman Heart Institute and serves on the board of the Empowerment Initiative at the University of Nebraska-Lincoln. She also served on the Ladies Auxiliary Committee of The Columbus Citizens Foundation, for which she received the Humanitarian Award in 2015. As of 2016, she serves as a member of the Board of Governors for the Parsons School of Design.

On June 10, 2018, Germanotta addressed the United Nations General Assembly on behalf of the Born This Way Foundation and launched the United for Global Mental Health initiative. On May 20, 2019, the United Nations' World Health Organization announced that Germanotta would be one of four new Goodwill Ambassadors, as the ambassador for mental health.

Personal life 
Germanotta is married to Joseph Germanotta, an internet entrepreneur and restaurateur (owner of the Art Bird & Whiskey Bar in Grand Central Terminal), and lives on the Upper West Side of Manhattan. She previously lived in West Village. They own an Italian restaurant in New York called Joanne Trattoria and have two daughters, Stefani and Natali. Germanotta is Catholic and is a parishioner at the Church of the Blessed Sacrament. In 2017, she appeared in the documentary Gaga: Five Foot Two.

References 

1954 births
Living people
Activists from West Virginia
People from Wheeling, West Virginia
American women philanthropists
American Roman Catholics
American women business executives
Germanotta family
Lady Gaga
Mental health activists
Organization founders
Verizon Communications people
West Virginia University alumni
Trachtenberg School of Public Policy & Public Administration alumni
American people of Italian descent
American people of French descent
American people of French-Canadian descent
Philanthropists from West Virginia